Pachliopta phlegon is a species of butterfly from the family Papilionidae (the swallowtails) that is found in the Philippines.

The larvae feed on Aristolochia species.

References

Page M. G.P & Treadaway,C. G.  2003 Schmetterlinge der Erde, Butterflies of the World Part XVII (17), Papilionidae IX Papilionidae of the Philippine Islands. Edited by Erich Bauer and  Thomas Frankenbach  Keltern : Goecke & Evers ; Canterbury : Hillside Books. 

Butterflies described in 1864
Butterflies of Asia
Pachliopta